These are the Lithuanian football standings from 1951–1960.

1951

 A Klase
  
  1 Inkaras Kaunas            21 19  1  1  90- 13  77  39
  2 Elnias Siauliai           21 13  3  5  51- 20  31  29
  3 Kauno audiniai            21 13  2  6  55- 29  26  28
  4 Lituanika Kaunas          21 12  3  6  61- 35  26  27
  5 Dinamo Vilnius            21 10  2  9  68- 33  35  22
  6 Audra Klaipeda            21 10  1 10  36- 34   2  21
  7 ASK Kaunas                21  8  5  8  32- 36  -4  21
  8 Saliutas Vilnius          11  6  4  1  36- 17  19  16
  9 Zalgiris Panevezys        21  4  5 12  28- 64 -36  13
 10 Zalgiris Kybartai         21  4  3 14  30- 59 -29  11
 11 Dinamo Utena              21  3  2 16  22- 94 -72   8
 12 Zalgiris Ukmerge          21  3  1 17  20- 95 -75   7
  
 Promotion 
   Gubernija Siauliai
   Lima Kaunas
  
  
 CUP  
  
 SemiFinal
   Inkaras Kaunas - Dinamo Utena  3:0
   Elnias Siauliai - Lima Kaunas  3:0
  
 Final
   Inkaras Kaunas - Elnias Siauliai  2:0

1952

 A Klase
 
  1 KN Vilnius                22 15  5  2  54- 14  40  35
  2 Inkaras Kaunas            22 16  1  5  66- 27  39  33
  3 Elnias Siauliai           22 13  3  6  50- 26  24  29
  4 Lima Kaunas               22 12  3  7  48- 27  21  27
  5 Lituanika Kaunas          22 10  6  6  35- 40  -5  26
  6 Dinamo Vilnius            22  8  7  7  31- 20  11  23
  7 Kauno audiniai            22  8  5  9  32- 33  -1  21
  8 Gubernija Siauliai        22  7  6  9  28- 50 -22  20
  9 KPI Kaunas                22  8  3 11  21- 34 -13  19
 10 Triniciai Klaipeda        22  4  8 10  34- 36  -2  16
 11 Zalgiris Panevezys        22  3  3 16  29- 65 -36   9
 12 GSK Kybartai              22  1  4 17  21- 77 -56   6
   
 Promotion
   JJPF Kaunas 
   Spartakas Plunge  
   
 
 CUP
 
 SemiFinal
   KN Vilnius - Eidukeviciaus fab. Vilnius  3:0
   Dinamo Vilnius - Kauno audiniai  2:1
 
 Final
   KN Vilnius - Dinamo Vilnius  1:0

1953

 A Klase
  
  1 Elnias Siauliai           21 15  4  2  45- 20  25  34
  2 Inkaras Kaunas            21 14  4  3  58- 15  43  32
  3 Lima Kaunas               21 12  3  6  41- 26  15  27
  4 KPI Kaunas                21  9  6  6  32- 25   7  24
  5 JJPF Kaunas               21  9  4  8  24- 30  -6  22
  6 Lituanika Kaunas          21  8  4  9  40- 43  -3  20
  7 Dinamo Vilnius            21  8  3 10  26- 33  -7  19
  8 Triniciai Klaipeda        21  8  2 11  34- 47 -13  18
  9 Spartakas Plunge          21  6  4 11  27- 38 -11  16
 10 Gubernija Siauliai        21  5  3 13  14- 33 -19  13
 11 Elfa Vilnius              11  5  2  4  16- 13   3  12
 12 Kauno audiniai            21  2  1 18  11- 45 -34   5
  
   KN Vilnius                 11  5  2  4  24-  8  16  12
   
 Promotion
   KN Vilnius
   Raud. Spalis Kaunas
   
  
 CUP
 
 SemiFinal
   Lima Kaunas - Elnias Siauliai  3:2
   Triniciai Klaipeda - Spartakas Plunge  1:0
  
 Final
   Lima Kaunas - Triniciai Klaipeda  4:2

1954

 A Klase
  
  1 Inkaras Kaunas            19 17  1  1  44- 18  26  35
  2 Lima Kaunas               19 12  1  6  27- 26   1  25
  3 Elnias Siauliai           19 11  1  7  57- 28  29  23
  4 Raud. Spalis Kaunas       20 10  3  7  35- 33   2  23
  5 KPI Kaunas                19  8  6  5  32- 26   6  22
  6 Spartakas Vilnius         19  7  4  8  39- 32   7  18
  7 JJPF Kaunas               19  5  4 10  28- 38 -10  14
  8 Trinyciai Klaipeda        19  5  2 12  26- 41 -15  12
  9 Elfa Vilnius              19  4  4 11  24- 46 -22  12
 10 Karin. Namai Vilnius      11  4  3  4  13- 11   2  11
 11 Gubernija Siauliai        19  2  3 14  18- 44 -26   7
 12 Dinamo Vilnius
   
 Promotion
   MSK Panevezys
 
   
   CUP
  
 SemiFinal
   Inkaras Kaunas - Lima Kaunas  2:1
   KPI Kaunas - KN Vilnius  2:0
  
 Final
   Inkaras Kaunas - KPI Kaunas  4:0

1955

 A Klase
  
  1 Lima Kaunas               20 11  7  2  38- 16  22  29
  2 Raud. Spalis Kaunas       20 14  1  5  49- 23  26  29
  3 Elfa Vilnius              20 12  4  4  35- 26   9  28
  4 Inkaras Kaunas            20  9  6  5  39- 31   8  24
  5 KPI Kaunas                20 10  4  6  33- 30   3  24
  6 Spartakas Vilnius         20 11  1  8  50- 38  12  23
  7 MSK Panevezys             20  8  4  8  44- 38   6  20
  8 Elnias Siauliai           20  5  5 10  34- 44 -10  15
  9 Trinyciai Klaipeda        20  5  3 12  29- 25   4  13
 10 Gubernija Siauliai        20  4  2 14  20- 62 -42  10
 11 JJPF Kaunas               20  2  1 17  18- 56 -38   5
  
 Final
 
   Lima Kaunas - Raud. Spalis Kaunas  3:0
   
 Promotion
   Linu audiniai Plunge
   Raud. zvaigzde Vilnius
   
  
   CUP
 
 SemiFinal
   Linu audiniai Plunge - Inkaras Kaunas  3:1
   KPI Kaunas - MSK Panevezys  3:1
  
 Final
   KPI Kaunas - Linu audiniai Plunge  2:0

1956

 A Klase
  
  1 Linu audiniai Plunge      22 16  4  2  42- 13  29  36
  2 Elnias Siauliai           22 15  3  4  71- 22  49  33
  3 MSK Panevezys             22 15  0  7  54- 47   7  30
  4 KPI Kaunas                22 13  2  7  42- 38   4  28
  5 Spartakas Vilnius         22 11  5  6  53- 34  19  27
  6 Inkaras Kaunas            22  8  8  6  38- 28  10  24
  7 Raud. Spalis Kaunas       22  8  5  9  52- 44   8  21
  8 Elfa Vilnius              22  9  2 11  44- 32  12  20
  9 Lima Kaunas               22  7  3 12  40- 39   1  17
 10 Raud. zvaigzde Vilnius    22  7  3 12  27- 41 -14  17
 11 Svyturys Klaipeda         22  3  3 16  23- 76 -53   9
 12 Gubernija Siauliai        22  0  2 20   8- 80 -72   2
   
 Promotion
   Nemunas Vilkaviskis
   
  
   CUP
 
 SemiFinal
   Raud. Zvaigzde Vilnius - Elfa Vilnius  3:1
   Raud. Spalis Kaunas - KPI Kaunas  1:1  4:0
  
 Final
   Raud. Spalis Kaunas - Raud. Zvaigzde Vilnius  3:0

1957

 A Klase
  
  1 Elnias Siauliai           26 20  5  1  73- 11  62  45
  2 Inkaras Kaunas            26 18  5  3  59- 26  33  41
  3 Linu audiniai Plunge      26 13  8  5  37- 30   7  34
  4 Elfa Vilnius              26 14  4  8  59- 25  34  32
  5 MSK Panevezys             26 11  8  7  60- 48  12  30
  6 Spartakas Vilnius         26 13  4  9  52- 41  11  30
  7 Raud. Spalis Kaunas       26 14  1 11  62- 45  17  29
  8 Lima Kaunas               26 11  6  9  40- 33   7  28
  9 KPI Kaunas                26 12  3 11  37- 37   0  27
 10 Raud. zvaigzde Vilnius    26  8  5 13  27- 32  -5  21
 11 Spartakas Kaunas          26  5  3 18  15- 55 -40  13
 12 Svyturys Klaipeda         26  5  2 19  28- 67 -39  12
 13 RPK Vilkaviskis           26  3  6 17  24- 60 -36  12
 14 Spartakas Vilnius (Youth) 26  4  2 20  25- 88 -63  10
 
 Promotion
   Cukraus fab. Kapsukas
  
 
   CUP 
  
 SemiFinal
   Elnias Siauliai - Inkaras Kaunas  1:0
   MSK Panevezys - Maistas Taurage  1:0
 
 Final
   Elnias Siauliai - MSK Panevezys  2:0

1958

 A Klase
  
  1 Elnias Siauliai           11  8  1  2  22- 11  11  17
  2 Raud. zvaigzde Vilnius    11  6  4  1  18-  7  11  16
  3 Spartakas Vilnius         11  7  2  2  25- 18   7  16
  4 Inkaras Kaunas            11  4  4  3  19-  9  10  12
  5 MSK Panevezys             11  5  2  4  21- 18   3  12
  6 Raud. Spalis Kaunas       11  6  0  5  22- 20   2  12
  7 Linu audiniai Plunge      11  4  3  4  12- 15  -3  11
  8 KPI Kaunas                11  3  4  4  20- 10  10  10
  9 Baltija Klaipeda          11  4  1  6  16- 25  -9   9
 10 Lima Kaunas               11  2  4  5   7- 19 -12   8
 11 Cukraus fab. Kapsukas     11  3  1  7  14- 26 -12   7
 12 Elfa Vilnius              11  0  2  9   6- 24 -18   2
 
 Promotion
   KKI Kaunas
   Melioratorius Kretinga
 
   
   CUP
  
 SemiFinal
   Spartakas Vilnius - Elnias Siauliai  4:0
   Melioratorius Kretinga - Cukraus fab. Kapsukas  4:
  
 Final
   Spartakas Vilnius - Melioratorius Kretinga  5:3

1958/59

 A Klase
  
  1 Raud. zvaigzde Vilnius    22 14  8  0  26- 11  15  36
  2 KKI Kaunas                22 11  8  3  40- 20  20  30
  3 Elnias Siauliai           22 10  7  5  30- 22   8  27
  4 Linu audiniai Plunge      22 10  4  8  22- 29  -7  24
  5 MSK Panevezys             22  9  5  8  40- 30  10  23
  6 Spartakas Vilnius         22  7  8  7  24- 22   2  22
  7 Inkaras Kaunas            22  9  2 11  44- 33  11  20
  8 Melioratorius Kretinga    22  6  6 10  25- 32  -7  18
  9 Lima Kaunas               22  5  8  9  22- 33 -11  18
 10 LRI Klaipeda              22  6  6 10  18- 39 -21  18
 11 Raud. Spalis Kaunas       22  6  5 11  33- 43 -10  17
 12 KPI Kaunas                22  4  7 11  20- 30 -10  15
  
 
 Promotion
   Statybininkas Siauliai
   Cukraus fab. Kapsukas
 
   
   CUP
  
 SemiFinal
   Elnias Siauliai - Spartakas Vilnius  1:0
   KKI Kaunas - LRI Klaipeda  3:0
  
 Final
   Elnias Siauliai - KKI Kaunas  2:0

1959/60

 A Klase 
  
  1 Elnias Siauliai           22 14  2  6  52- 29  23  30
  2 Raud. zvaigzde Vilnius    22 11  8  3  40- 19  21  30
  3 Linu audiniai Plunge      22 12  5  5  30- 23   7  29
  4 Inkaras Kaunas            22 11  4  7  36- 22  14  26
  5 Spartakas Vilnius         22 12  0 10  54- 40  14  24
  6 Melioratorius Kretinga    22  9  6  7  33- 39  -6  24
  7 KKI Kaunas                22  8  3 11  34- 38  -4  19
  8 Audra/Baltija Klaipeda    22  7  5 10  31- 38  -7  19
  9 MSK Panevezys             22  7  3 12  40- 47  -7  17
 10 Cukraus fab. Kapsukas     22  7  3 12  26- 45 -19  17
 11 Lima Kaunas               22  6  4 12  27- 42 -15  16
 12 Statybininkas Siauliai    22  6  1 15  32- 53 -21  13
 
 Final
   
   Elnias Siauliai - Raud. zvaigzde Vilnius  3:2
 
   
 Promotion
   KPI Kaunas
   Lok Vilnius
  
 
   CUP
  
 Semifinal
   Inkaras Kaunas - Mastis Telsiai  5:1 
   Panemune - Lok Vilnius  2:0
  
 Final
   Panemune - Inkaras Kaunas  2:1

Sources
RSSF/Almantas Lahzadis

Football in Lithuania